Traditional Vietnamese personal names generally consist of three parts, used in Eastern name order.

 A family name (normally patrilineal, The father's family name may be combined with the mother's family name to form a compound family name).
 A middle name (normally a single name but some have no middle name).
 A given name (normally single name but some have multiple given names).

But not every name is conformant. For example:
 Nguyễn Trãi has his family name Nguyễn and his given name is Trãi. He does not have any middle name.
 Phạm Bình Minh has his family name Phạm and his given name is Bình Minh. He does not have any middle name.
Nguyễn Văn Quyết has his family name Nguyễn, his middle name is Văn and his given name is Quyết.
 Nguyễn Ngọc Trường Sơn has his family name  Nguyễn, his middle name is Ngọc and his given name is Trường Sơn.
 Hoàng Phủ Ngọc Tường (a Vietnamese poet) has his family name Hoàng Phủ (natural compound family name), his middle name is Ngọc and his given name is Tường. Sometimes his family name is confused with Hoàng.
 Trần Lê Quốc Toàn has his compound family name combined from Trần (from his father) and Lê (from his mother), his middle name is Quốc and his given name is Toàn.

The "family name first" written order follows the system of Chinese names and is common throughout the East Asian cultural sphere. However, it is different from Chinese, Korean, and Japanese names in the usage of a "middle name," which is less common in China and Korea and uncommon in Japan. Persons can be referred to by the whole name, the given name, or a hierarchic pronoun, which usually connotes a degree of family relationship or kinship – but referring via given name is most common, as well as if degree of family relationship or kinship is unknown. In more informal contexts given name can be written first then family name e.g. Châu Bùi or Thanh Trần.

The Vietnamese language is tonal and so are Vietnamese names. Names with the same spelling but different tones represent different meanings, which can confuse people when the accent marks are dropped, as is commonly done outside Vietnam (e.g. Đoàn vs Doãn, both are dropped marks as Doan). Additionally, some Vietnamese names can only be differentiated via context or with their corresponding chữ Hán, such as Vũ (武) and Vũ (巫).  Anyone applying for Vietnamese nationality must also adopt a Vietnamese name. Vietnamese is also a script that is fully transliterated (romanized), as Hán-Nôm was replaced by Chữ Quốc Ngữ, which was made compulsory during the colonial era for Vietnamese.

Family name 

The family name is positioned first and is passed on by the father to his children. It is estimated that there are around 100 family names in common use, but some are far more common than others. The name Nguyễn is estimated to be the most common (40%) in 2005.  The top three names are so common, because people tended to take the family names of emperors to show loyalty to particular dynasties in history. Over many generations, these family names became permanent.

The most common family names among the Vietnamese are the following with their commonly used Chữ Quốc Ngữ spelling, and their corresponding Hán-Nôm (Han-Nom Characters) which have become obsolete. The following figures are from 100 họ phổ biến ở Việt Nam (100 most popular Vietnamese surnames/family names) from Nhà xuất bản Khoa học Xã hội (Social Science Publishing House). 

  

In 2005, these 14 names had accounted for around 90% of the Viet population.

The following list includes less-common surnames in alphabetical order which make up the other 10% (2005), now 16.3% (2022):

Other 

 Ái: 愛
 An: 安
 Ân: 殷
 Bạch: 白
 Bành: 彭
 Bao: 包
 Biên: 邊
 Biện: 卞
 Cam: 甘
 Cảnh: 耿
 Cảnh: 景
 Cao: 高
 Cái: 蓋
 Cát: 葛
 Chân: 甄
 Châu: 周
 Chiêm: 詹
 Chu: 朱
 Chung: 鍾
 Chử: 褚
 Cổ: 古
 Cù: 瞿
 Cung: 宮
 Cung: 龔
 Củng: 鞏
 Cừu: 裘
 Dịch: 易
 Diệp: 葉
 Doãn: 尹
 Dũ: 俞
 Dung: 容
 Dư: 余
 Dữu: 庾
 Đái: 戴
 Đàm: 譚
 Đào: 陶
 Đậu: 竇
 Điền: 田
 Đinh: 丁
 Đoàn: 段
 Đồ: 涂
 Đồng: 童
 Đổng: 董
 Đường: 唐
 Giả: 賈
 Giải: 解
 Gia Cát :諸葛
 Giản: 簡
 Giang: 江
 Giáp: 郟
 Hà: 何
 Hạ: 賀
 Hậ: 夏
 Hác: 郝
 Hàn: 韓
 Hầu: 侯
 Hình: 邢
 Hoa: 花
 Hoắc: 霍
 Hoạn: 宦
 Hồng: 洪
 Hứa: 許
 Hướng: 向
 Hy: 郗
 Kha: 柯
 Khâu: 邱
 Khổng: 孔
 Khuất: 屈
 Kiều: 喬
 Kim: 金
 Kỳ: 祁
 Kỷ: 紀
 La: 羅
 Lạc: 駱
 Lại: 賴
 Lam: 藍
 Lăng: 凌
 Lãnh: 冷
 Lâm: 林
 Lận: 藺
 Lệ: 酈
 Liên: 連
 Liêu: 廖
 Liễu (in northern or central regions): 柳
 Long: 龍
 Lôi: 雷
 Lục: 陸
 Lư: 盧
 Lữ: 呂
 Lương: 梁
 Lưu (in central or southern regions): 劉
 Mã: 馬
 Mạc: 莫
 Mạch: 麥
 Mai: 梅
 Mạnh: 孟
 Mao: 毛
 Mẫn: 閔
 Miêu: 苗
 Minh: 明
 Mông: 蒙
 Ngân: 鄞
 Nghê: 倪
 Nghiêm: 嚴
 Ngư: 魚
 Ngưu: 牛
 Nhạc: 岳
 Nhan: 顔
 Nhâm: 任
 Nhiếp: 聶
 Nhiều: 饒
 Nhung: 戎
 Ninh: 寧 & 甯
 Nông: 農
 Ôn: 溫
 Ổn: 鄔
 Ông: 翁
 Phí: 費
 Phó: 傅
 Phong: 酆
 Phòng: 房
 Phù: 符
 Phùng: 馮
 Phương: 方
 Quách: 郭
 Quan: 關
 Quản: 管
 Quang: 光
 Quảng: 鄺
 Quế: 桂
 Quyền: 權
 Sài: 柴
 Sầm: 岑
 Sử: 史
 Tạ: 謝
 Tào: 曹
 Tăng: 曾
 Tân: 辛
 Tần: 秦
 Tất: 畢
 Tề: 齊
 Thạch: 石
 Thai: 邰
 Thái: 蔡
 Thang: 湯
 Thành: 成
 Thảo: 草
 Thân: 申
 Thi: 施
 Thích: 戚
 Thiện: 單
 Thiệu: 邵
 Thôi: 崔
 Thủy: 水
 Thư: 舒
 Thường: 常
 Tiền: 錢
 Tiết: 薛
 Tiêu: 焦
 Tiêu: 蕭
 Tô: 蘇
 Tôn: 孫
 Tôn Thất:尊室
 Tông: 宗
 Tống: 宋
 Trác: 卓
 Trạch: 翟
 Trại: 賽
 Trang: 莊
 Trầm: 沈/瀋
 Trâu: 鄒
 Trì: 池
 Triệu: 趙
 Trịnh: 鄭 (almost exclusively a northern surname, based around Thanh Hóa)
 Từ: 徐
 Tư Mã: 司馬
 Tưởng: 蔣
 Úc: 郁
 Ứng: 應
 Vạn: 萬
 Văn: 文
 Vân: 雲
 Vi: 韋
 Vĩnh: 永
 Vũ: 巫
 Vũ Văn: 武文
 Vương: 王
 Vưu: 尤
 Xà: 佘
 Xầm: 諶 (almost exclusively a northern surname)
 Xế: 車
 Yên: 鄢
 Yến: 燕

In Vietnamese culture, women tend to keep their family names once they marry, whilst the progeny tend to keep the father's family name, although names can often be combined from father's and mother's family name e.g. Nguyễn Lê, Phạm Vũ, Kim Lý etc. In formal contexts, people are referred to by their full name. In more casual contexts, people are always on a "first-name basis", which involves their given names, accompanied by proper kinship terms.

In some regions of Vietnam, the daughter's last name is taken from her father's middle name instead. In Son Dong commune (Hoai Duc district), Tan Lap commune (Dan Phuong district), Cong Hoa commune (Quoc Oai district) of Hanoi, and Lien Khe commune, Khoai Chau district, Hung Yen province, there is a custom of girls not bearing the father's last name, but taking the father's middle name instead. From there arise surnames such as Dac, Dinh, Sy, Tri, Ngoc, Van, Tiep, Doan, Que, Danh, Huu, Khac, etc.  This custom does not apply to boys. The people in these localities believe that the father's surname was a "borrowed" surname, not the original surname, and that the father's middle name is the real, original surname. Meanwhile in these communes, boys always take their father's last name and middle name, while girls take their father's middle name as their last name.

Middle name 
Most Vietnamese have one middle name, but it is quite common to have two or more or to have no middle name at all.

In the past, the middle name was selected by parents from a fairly narrow range of options. Almost all women had Thị as their middle name, and many men had Văn. More recently, a broader range of names has been used, and people named Thị usually omit their middle name because they do not like to call it with their name.

Thị is a most common female middle name, and most common amongst pre-1975 generation but less common amongst younger generations. Thị is an archaic Vietnamese suffix meaning surname of the husband for a married woman, but now is used to simply indicate the female sex. For example, "Trần Thị Mai Loan" is a person who has the given name "Mai Loan" and the surname "Trần". Altogether, the name means "Mai Loan, a female person of the Trần family".  Some traditional male middle names may include Văn, Hữu, Đức, Thành, Công, Minh,  and Quang.

The middle name can have several uses, with the fourth being most common nowadays:
 To indicate a person's generation. Brothers and sisters may share the same middle name, which distinguish them from the generation before them and the generation after them (see generation name).
 To separate branches of a large family: "Nguyễn Hữu", "Nguyễn Sinh", "Trần Lâm" (middle names can be taken from the mother's family name). However, this usage is still controversial. Some people consider them to be a part of their family names, not family name + middle name. Some families may, however, set up arbitrary rules about giving a different middle name to each generation.
 To indicate a person's position (birth order) in the family. This usage is less common than others.
To provide a poetic and positive meaning e.g. "Trần Gia Hạnh Phúc" meaning  "Happiness to the Trần family".

The first three are no longer in use, and seen as too rigid and strictly conforming to family naming systems. Most middle names utilise the fourth, having a name to simply imply some positive characteristics.

Given name 
In most cases, the middle name is formally part of the given name. For example, the name "Đinh Quang Dũng" is separated into the surname "Đinh" and the given name "Quang Dũng". In a normal name list, those two parts of the full name are put in two different columns. However, in daily conversation, the last word in a given name with a title before it is used to call or address a person: "Ông Dũng", "Anh Dũng", etc., with "Ông" and "Anh" being words to address the person and depend on age, social position, etc.

The given name is the primary form of address for Vietnamese. It is chosen by parents and usually has a literal meaning in the Vietnamese language. Names often represent beauty, such as bird or flower names, or attributes and characteristics that the parents want in their child, such as modesty (Khiêm, 謙).

Typically, Vietnamese will be addressed with their given name, even in formal situations, although an honorific equivalent to "Mr.", "Mrs.", etc. will be added when necessary. That contrasts with the situation in many other cultures in which the family name is used in formal situations, but it is a practice similar to usage in Icelandic usage and, to some degree, Polish. It is similar to the Latin-American and southern European custom of referring to women as "Doña/Dona" and men as "Don/Dom", along with their first name.

Addressing someone by the family name is rare. In the past, women were usually called by their (maiden) family name, with thị (氏) as a suffix, similar to China and Korea. In recent years, doctors are more likely than any other social group to be addressed by their family name, but that form of reference is more common in the north than in the south. Some extremely famous people are sometimes referred to by their family names, such as Hồ Chí Minh (Bác Hồ—"Uncle Hồ) (however, his real surname is Nguyễn), Trịnh Công Sơn (nhạc Trịnh—"Trịnh music), and Hồ Xuân Hương (nữ sĩ họ Hồ—"the poetess with the family name Hồ). Traditionally, people in Vietnam, particularly North Vietnam, addressed parents using the first child's name: Mr and Mrs Anh or Master Minh.

When being addressed within the family, children are sometimes referred to by their birth number, starting with one in the north but two in the south. That practice is less common recently, especially in the north.

Double names are also common. For example,  has the given name .

Examples 
 Lê Lợi (a Emperor of the Lê dynasty) has Lê is his family name and Lợi is his given name. He does not have any middle name.
Nguyễn Phúc Vĩnh San (Emperor Duy Tân) has Nguyễn is his family name, Phúc is his middle name, and Vĩnh San is his given name (a double names). The name is similar to Nguyễn Phúc Ánh (Emperor Gia Long, the first emperor of Nguyễn dynasty), who is commontly called as Nguyễn Ánh.
Tôn Thất Thuyết has Tôn Thất is his family name (a compound surname) and Thuyết is his given name. He does not have any middle name. Sometimes his family name is confused with Tôn.
Nguyễn Tấn Dũng (a former prime minister) has Nguyễn is his family name, Tấn is his middle name, and Dũng is his given name. In Vietnamese formal usage, he is referred to as Nguyễn Tấn Dũng, but by his given name ("Mr. Dũng") in English-language text of Vietnamese multimedia, not by his family name ("Mr. Nguyễn").  Informally he is "Ba Dũng" in Vietnamese.
 Likewise, the famous general and military leader, Võ Nguyên Giáp, is referred to in Vietnamese by his full name (Võ Nguyên Giáp) in formal sources, but by his given name in English, i.e. "General Giáp".  Informally, he is "Ông Giáp" or "Tướng Giáp" in Vietnamese.

Saints' names 

Boys are given male saints' names, while girls are given female saints' names. This name appears first, before the family name, in formal religious contexts. Out of respect, clergy are usually referred to by saints' name. The saint's name also functions as a posthumous name, used instead of an individual's given name in prayers after their death.

Saints' names are respelled phonetically according to the Vietnamese alphabet. Some more well-known saints' names are derived further into names that sound more Vietnamese or easier to pronounce for Vietnamese speakers.

Near-homonyms distinguished by vowel or tones 
Some names may appear the same if simplified into a basic ASCII script, as for example on websites, but are different names:
 Trịnh Căn (鄭根, 1633–1709) reformist warlord, vs. Trịnh Cán (鄭檊, 1777–1782) infant heir of warlord Trịnh Sâm
 Nguyễn Du (1765–1820) writer, vs. Nguyễn Dữ (c.1550) writer
 Hoàng Tích Chu (1897–1933) journalist, vs. Hoàng Tích Chù (1912–2003) painter
 Nguyễn Văn Tỵ (1917–1992) painter and poet, vs. Nguyễn Văn Tý (1925–2019), composer
 Phan Thanh Hùng (1960) football manager, vs. Phan Thanh Hưng (1987), footballer
 Nguyễn Bình (1906–1951), vs. Nguyễn Bính (1918–1966)
 Nguyễn Văn Hưng (1958–) representative of the Vietnam National Assembly, vs. Nguyễn Văn Hùng (1980), martial artist,

Typically, as in the above examples, it is middle or the last personal given name which varies, as almost any Hán-Nôm character may be used. The number of family names is limited.

Further, some historical names may be written using different chữ Hán (Chinese characters), but are still written the same in the modern Vietnamese alphabet.

Indexing and sorting in English 
According to the English-language Chicago Manual of Style, Vietnamese names in are indexed according to the "given name, then surname + middle name", with a cross-reference placed in regards to the family name. Ngô Đình Diệm would be listed as "Diệm, Ngô Đình" and Võ Nguyên Giáp would be listed as "Giáp, Võ Nguyên". In Vietnamese, Vietnamese names are also typically sorted using the same order.

But at the present, Vietnamese names are commonly indexed according "middle-name given-name then SURNAME" in Western name order, or "SURNAME then middle-name given-name" in Eastern name order, to determine exactly the part of surname, especially in media (TV, website, SNS) at events of sports games. This method is similar to Chinese names or Korean names in events. For example:

See also 
 Surname
Other similar naming systems:
Korean name
Chinese name
 Japanese name
List of common Vietnamese surnames
 List of common Chinese surnames
List of common Korean surnames
List of common Japanese surnames
 List of most common surnames

References

External links 
 Vietnamese Naming Customs in Olden Days
 Vietnamese names for girls and boys (limited)
 Introduction to Vietnamese
 Vietnamese names (examples and tonal pronunciation), video lesson

Names by culture
 
Vietnamese traditions